Big Brother 2007 was the third season of the Finnish reality television season Big Brother. It aired on SubTV in Finland, from 28 August 2007 to 2 December 2007, and lasted 97 days.

A number of contestants (known as "housemates") lived in a purpose-built house in Espoo, and were isolated from the rest of the world. Each week, each housemate nominated two of their peers for eviction, and the housemates who received the most nominations would face a public vote. Of these, one would eventually leave, having been "evicted" from the House. However, there sometimes were exceptions to this process as dictated by Big Brother, known as "twists".

Vappu Pimiä was the host of Big Brother Talk Show for the first time in this season; Janne Kataja hosted Big Brother Extra since Pimiä left Extra to host the Talk Show.

Housemates
There were a total of twenty housemates in this season of Big Brother. Twelve entered at the Launch, including Piia, who was the winner of a vote on an internet video site, and won a place in the house. Heli entered after Tiina M left the house after she found out she was pregnant. Four new housemates - Farbod, Niko, Suvi and Tiina H entered shortly after Henri's eviction. Aki was ejected for not disclosing important issues about himself during the casting process and was replaced by Jussi. Martina entered the house after Maxine's eviction, and left when she learnt of her grandfather's death, and was replaced by Riita, who was the final housemate to enter the house in this season.

Voting format 
Any viewer may cast as many evict or save votes as they choose. Prior to eviction each housemates' evict votes were merged with their save votes; the housemate with the lowest number of save votes remaining after the merge is evicted.

Nominations table

Notes
 Heli was immune from being nominated as she was a new housemate, she was able to nominate.
 Henri was given 2 points by Big Brother as a punishment because he's tried to communicate with the outside world on several occasions.
 Farbod, Niko, Suvi and Tiina H were immune from being nominated as they were new housemates, they were able to nominate.
 Jussi was immune from being nominated as he was a new housemate, he was able to nominate.
 Kadi answered the phone, and she had to choose the first nominee. She chose Timo to be automatically up for eviction.
 Martina was immune from being nominated as she was a new housemate, she was able to nominate.
 Martina and Kadi received the most nomination points this week. However, as Martina voluntarily left the house, Timo is up for eviction with Kadi.
 Riitta was immune from being nominated as she was a new housemate, she was able to nominate.
 Jarkko answered the phone, and by doing so was automatically nominated by Big Brother.
 Big Brother declared these nominations void and instead all five remaining housemates are up for eviction and face the public vote.
 There were no nominations in the final week, instead, the public was voting for their winner, rather than be evicted.

References

External links
Official website 

2007 Finnish television seasons
03